Corin Hewitt (born 1971) is an American artist. His work has been shown widely in the U.S. as well as Europe. He has had several U.S. solo museum exhibitions including at the Whitney Museum of American Art, Museum of Contemporary Art Cleveland and Seattle Art Museum. Hewitt's work is held in the collections of the Whitney and Seattle Art Museum. He has been awarded a Joan Mitchell Foundation Grant, a 2011 Guggenheim Fellowship, and a 2014/15 Rome Prize. He is an Associate Professor of Sculpture and Extended Media at Virginia Commonwealth University.

Career
Hewitt received a BA from Oberlin College and an MFA from Milton Avery School of Art at Bard College. He is an Associate Professor of Sculpture and Extended Media at Virginia Commonwealth University.

Solo exhibitions
Seed Stage, Whitney Museum of American Art, New York, 2008/2009
SAM Next: Corin Hewitt, Seattle Art Museum, Seattle, 2009
The Hedge, Museum of Contemporary Art Cleveland, 2013

Awards
2010: Joan Mitchell Foundation Grant
2011/12: Guggenheim Fellowship
2014/15: Rome Prize

Collections
Hewitt's work is held in the following permanent collection:
Seattle Art Museum, Seattle: 22 prints (as of April 2021)
Whitney Museum of American Art, New York: 75 prints (as of April 2021)

References

External links
Laurel Gitlen Gallery
Artist Pension Trust| Corin Hewitt
Public Art Fund | Legacy

1971 births
Living people
American sculptors
American photographers
Oberlin College alumni